Lucy Bailey is a British theatre director, known for productions such as Baby Doll at Britain's National Theatre
and a notorious Titus Andronicus. Bailey founded the Gogmagogs theatre-music group (1995–2006) and was Artistic Director and joint founder of the Print Room theatre in West London (2010-2012). She has worked extensively with Bunny Christie and other leading stage designers, including her husband William Dudley.

Biography
Bailey was born in Butleigh, Somerset, England. She has stated that her favourite films include anything by Pasolini. As a teenager Bailey studied the flute but finally gave up music to concentrate on theatre. Bailey studied English at St Peter's College, Oxford. She and her husband William Dudley have two sons.

Career
Lucy Bailey became interested in theatre when she worked as a telephonist at Glyndebourne at the age of 17.  As a university student aged 20 she had her first breakthrough when she wrote to Samuel Beckett requesting permission to stage his short story, Lessness. Beckett agreed to meet, and she showed him her design for a production. Although he said she had got it completely wrong, he gave her permission to stage it, which she did at The Oxford Playhouse in February 1982.

Bailey started her professional life as an assistant director at the Royal National Theatre, Glyndebourne Opera and the Royal Shakespeare Company. Bailey co-founded the Gogmagogs music theatre company in 1995, with Nell Catchpole and six other string players. Her return to straight theatre came when she was invited by Mark Rylance, then artistic director of the Globe Theatre, to direct there in the late 1990s, and her work there has included productions of Titus Andronicus and Macbeth. Bailey has also directed Shakespeare productions at the RSC in Stratford-upon-Avon, including The Taming of the Shrew, A Winter's Tale and Julius Caesar, with Greg Hicks in the title role.

Artistic Director
Lucy Bailey co-founded the 80-seat London venue Print Room, which opened on 10 November 2010,
and along with the producer Anda Winters was Artistic Director there until 2012.
At the Print Room, Bailey directed productions such as Fabrication by Pier Paolo Pasolini, Alan Ayckbourn’s Snake in the Grass, Tennessee Williams’ Kingdom of Earth
and Chekhov’s Uncle Vanya with Iain Glen in the title role.
Bailey and her producer renovated a 1950s warehouse into the theatre, situated just off Westbourne Grove, aiming to show challenging or unknown plays as well as classics. Bailey and Winters say that they first conceived the Print Room over a large glass of wine at the National Theatre. After Lucy Bailey's departure, Anda Winters moved the theatre to the Coronet Cinema.

Selected work
2018 - Switzerland at Ustinov Studio, Bath, and Ambassadors Theatre, London 
2017-2019 - Witness for the Prosecution at County Hall, London
2016 - Comus Sam Wanamaker Playhouse at Shakespeare's Globe
2016 - Kenny Morgan (Arcola Theatre) 
2014 - Dial M for Murder (UK wide Tour)
2014 - Titus Andronicus (revival) (Shakespeare's Globe)
2013 - King Lear with David Haig (Theatre Royal Bath) 
2014 - Fortune's Fool (The Old Vic) 
2013 - The Winter's Tale (Royal Shakespeare Company) 
2012 - The Taming of the Shrew (Royal Shakespeare Company)
2011 - The Beggar’s Opera (Regent’s Park Open Air Theatre) 
2010 - Macbeth (Shakespeare's Globe) 
2009 - Julius Caesar (Royal Shakespeare Company) 
2009 - Private Lives (Hampstead Theatre) 
2009 - Dial M for Murder (West Yorkshire Playhouse) 
2008 - Timon of Athens (Shakespeare's Globe) 
2007 - Glass Eels (Nell Leyshon) (Hampstead Theatre) 
2007 - Don't Look Now (stage adaptation) Lyceum Theatre (Sheffield)
2006 - Titus Andronicus (Shakespeare's Globe) 
2004 -2005 - The Postman Always Rings Twice (Playhouse/West End) with Val Kilmer
2005/7 - Comfort Me with Apples (Hampstead Theatre)
 2004 - The Night Season Royal National Theatre by Rebecca Lenkiewicz
 2001 - Troy Town (Battersea Arts Centre - BAC) 
1999-2000 - Baby Doll (Tennessee Williams) National Theatre/Albery Theatre West End
1997 - The Maid's Tragedy (Beaumont and Fletcher) (Shakespeare's Globe)

Productions as Artistic Director, Print Rooms
2010 - Fabrication (Affabulazione) (Pasolini)
2011 - Kingdom of the Earth (Tennessee Williams)
2011 - Snake in the Grass (Alan Ayckbourn)
2012 - Uncle Vanya (Anton Chekhov) with Iain Glen

Opera
1996 - Gudrun Fier Sang (Copenhagen dry dock)
1994 - Jenufa, Janacek, (English National Opera)
1994 - Cheryoumushki 1958 (Lyric Hammersmith)
1994 - Noye's Fludde, Benjamin Britten, (Aldeburgh Festival) 
1993 - Il Barbiere di Siviglia (Wexford Opera Festival)
1992 - Mary of Egypt (Aldeburgh Festival)
1992 - Adaptation of Pasolini’s Teorema (Maggio Musicale Florence/Munich Biennale/Queen Elizabeth Hall).
1990 - Triptych, Alexander Goehr (Aldeburgh Festival)
1989 - Mitridate (Wexford Opera Festival)

References

British theatre directors
Year of birth missing (living people)
Living people
Women theatre directors
Alumni of St Peter's College, Oxford